Sifelani Rwaziyeni (born 12 April 1983) is a Zimbabwean cricket umpire. He has stood in domestic matches in the 2016–17 Pro50 Championship and the 2017–18 Logan Cup.

References

External links
 

1983 births
Living people
Zimbabwean cricket umpires
Place of birth missing (living people)